Pseudohedya is a genus of moths belonging to the subfamily Olethreutinae of the family Tortricidae.

Species
Pseudohedya cincinna Falkovitsh, 1962
Pseudohedya dentata Oku, 2005
Pseudohedya fanjinica Yu & Li, 2006
Pseudohedya gradana (Christoph, 1882)
Pseudohedya liui Yu & Li, 2006
Pseudohedya plumbosana (Kawabe, 1972)
Pseudohedya retracta Falkovitsh, 1962
Pseudohedya satoi Kawabe, 1978

See also
List of Tortricidae genera

References

External links
tortricidae.com

Tortricidae genera
Olethreutinae